The AIM-260 Joint Advanced Tactical Missile (JATM) is an American beyond-visual-range air-to-air missile (BVRAAM) under development by Lockheed Martin. Designed to address advanced threats, the missile is expected to replace or supplement the AIM-120 AMRAAM currently in US service.

This program differs from the Long-Range Engagement Weapon being developed by Raytheon.

Development
Initial launch platforms are expected to be the U.S. Air Force F-22 Raptor  and the U.S. Navy F/A-18E/F Super Hornet, with integration with the F-35 Lightning II and F-15EX Eagle II planned afterward.

The AIM-260 program began in 2017 in response to long-range missiles developed by potential adversaries, such as the Chinese PL-15. The JATM is planned to start flight tests in 2021 and achieve initial operational capability (IOC) by 2022. The AIM-260 production is expected to overtake AIM-120 production by 2026.

In November 2021 it was revealed that the missile will have similar dimensions to the AIM-120, in order to ensure a minimal disruption of launch platform technology.

In November 2021, it was reported that around 30 Full Scale Aerial Target drones tests had already been conducted with the AIM-260 JATM for the past two years, since April 2020.

See also

References

AIM-120